Van der Meer is a Dutch toponymic surname meaning "from the lake". A common contracted form is Vermeer. Abroad the name has often been concatenated to Vander Meer or Vandermeer, and VanderMeer. It may refer to:
Van der Meer
Barend van der Meer (1659–1700), Dutch painter
 (1705–1758), Dutch VOC sailor and owner of a rhinoceros
Eddie Van Der Meer Dutch fingerstyle guitarist
Erik van der Meer (born 1967), Dutch football player and coach
 (1904–1994), Dutch archeologist and theologist
Gerrit van der Meer (born 1950), Dutch television and film producer
Harry van der Meer (born 1973), Dutch water polo player
Johan van der Meer (conductor) (19132011), Dutch choral conductor
Johannes van der Meer, alternative name of Jan Vermeer (1632–1675), Dutch  painter
 (1920–2008), Dutch organologist and museum curator
Jolande van der Meer (born 1964), Dutch swimmer
Jos van der Meer (born 1947), Dutch medical scientist
Karel van der Meer (1905–1978), Dutch football referee
L. Bouke van der Meer (born 1945), Dutch archaeologist
Maartje van der Meer-Offers (1891–1944), Dutch contralto singer
Marleen de Pater-van der Meer (1950–2015), Dutch politician
Maud van der Meer (born 1992), Dutch swimmer
Moritz Hohenbaum van der Meer (1718–1795), Swiss historian
Nicolaes Woutersz van der Meer (1575–1666), Dutch politician
Patrick van der Meer (born 1971), Dutch dressage rider
Rick van der Meer (born 1997), Dutch footballer
Rob van der Meer (born ca. 1956), Dutch Surgeon General
Robin van der Meer (born 1995), Dutch footballer
Robine van der Meer (born 1971), Dutch actress
Simon van der Meer (1925–2011), Dutch physicist
Stientje van Veldhoven-van der Meer (born 1973), Dutch politician
Stijn van der Meer (born 1993), Dutch baseball player
Susie van der Meer (born 1973), German singer-songwriter
Vonne van der Meer (born 1952), Dutch novelist and playwright
VanderMeer, Vandermeer, Vander Meer
Ann VanderMeer, American publisher and editor, wife of Jeff VanderMeer
Annie VanderMeer, American video game designer
Jeff VanderMeer (born 1968), American writer, husband of Ann VanderMeer
Jim Vandermeer (born 1980), Canadian ice hockey player
John Vandermeer (born 1940), American ecologist
Johnny Vander Meer (19141997), American baseball player
Nancy VanderMeer (born 1958), American politician
Pete Vandermeer (born 1975), Canadian ice hockey player
Tony Vandermeer (born 1962), American politician

See also
Van der Meersch

Dutch-language surnames
Surnames of Dutch origin
Dutch toponymic surnames